Arthur Achleitner (August 16, 1858 in Straubing, Bavaria, Germany – September 29, 1927 in Munich) was a German writer. His works are noteworthy because he describes local customs and peculiarities of the people in the Austrian and Bavarian Alps, and the Mediterranean regions of the former Austro-Hungarian Empire (mainly Croatia and Bosnia).

Works
 Aus Kroatien. Skizzen und Erzählungen  eLibrary Austria Project (elib austria text in German)
 Bergrichters Erdenwallen eLibrary Austria Project (elib austria text in German)
 Celsissimus eLibrary Austria Project (elib austria text in German)
 Im grünen Tann eLibrary Austria Project (elib austria text in German)

External links

 
 

1858 births
1927 deaths
German male writers